Dekaton was a town of ancient Thrace.

Its site is located north of Yeşilköy in European Turkey.

References

Populated places in ancient Thrace
Former populated places in Turkey
History of Istanbul Province